The 2000 Dutch Figure Skating Championships took place between 6 and 8 January 2000 in Amsterdam. Skaters competed in the disciplines of ladies' singles and ice dancing.

Senior results

Men

Ladies

Ice dancing

External links
 results

Dutch Figure Skating Championships
1999 in figure skating
Dutch Figure Skating Championships, 2000
2000 in Dutch sport